New York Latin ACE Awards are given annually to honor achievement in Latino cinema, television, radio and theatre by an organization of New York-based Hispanic journalists and correspondents.

ACE is an acronym for Asociación de Cronistas de Espectáculos de Nueva York.

History
Founding members were Miguel Ángel Gallástegui, its first provisional president; Nemesio Acevedo, Fernando Campos, José C. Cayón, Johnny Chévere, Manuel del Valle, Pedro Galiana, Efraín Hidalgo, Ramón Plazza, Santiago Pollarsky and Arístides Sotolongo.

The first Latin ACE Awards ceremony, after the winners were announced at the Club Sans Souci in Uptown Manhattan on May 25, 1969, took place officially at Madison Square Garden during an extended interlude of the rodeo show of Mexican motion picture star Tony Aguilar.

Films honored by the Latin ACE Awards include Tie Me Up! Tie Me Down! (1991), and  Little Spain

Notes

Categories
Categories of awards include:
 Films: several acting awards
 Films: several production awards
 Radio: best program 
 Theatre: several acting awards
 Theatre: several production awards
 Television: several acting awards
 Television: several production awards
 Telesion: several general awards
 Television Cable: personality and best program awards

External links
 Latin Ace Awards official web site.
 Latin ACE Film Awards list published by the United Press International, January 2015.

Awards established in 1969
American film awards
Latin American culture
Latin American film awards
American television awards
American theater awards
Hispanic and Latino American culture in New York (state)